Ahn Hyun-suk (born 26 October 1984) is a former South Korean badminton player. He was the bronze medallists at the 2001 Asian Junior Championships in the boys' singles and team events. He educated at the Korea National Sport University. In the senior event, Ahn who was part of the Gimcheon City team, became the finalist at the 2003 U.S. Open, won the title at the 2004 Vietnam and 2008 Singapore Satellite tournaments. Ahn started his career as a coach in Yonex South Korean team in 2016.

Achievements

Asian Junior Championships
Boys' singles

IBF World Grand Prix 
The World Badminton Grand Prix sanctioned by International Badminton Federation (IBF) since 1983.

Men's singles

BWF International Challenge/Series
Men's singles

 BWF International Challenge tournament
 BWF International Series tournament

References

External links
 

1984 births
Living people
South Korean male badminton players
Badminton coaches
Korea National Sport University alumni